Myosin light chain kinase, smooth muscle also known as kinase-related protein (KRP) or telokin is an enzyme that in humans is encoded by the MYLK gene.

Function 

This gene, a muscle member of the immunoglobulin superfamily, encodes a myosin light-chain kinase, which is a calcium-/calmodulin-dependent enzyme. This kinase phosphorylates myosin regulatory light chains to facilitate myosin interaction with actin filaments to produce contractile activity. This gene encodes both smooth muscle and nonmuscle isoforms. In addition, using a separate promoter in an intron in the 3' region, it encodes telokin, a small protein identical in sequence to the C-terminus of myosin light chain kinase, that is independently expressed in smooth muscle and functions to stabilize unphosphorylated myosin filaments. A pseudogene is located on the p arm of chromosome 3. Four transcript variants that produce four isoforms of the calcium/calmodulin dependent enzyme have been identified as well as two transcripts that produce two isoforms of telokin. Additional variants have been identified but lack full length transcripts.

See also
 Myosin light-chain kinase

References

Further reading

External links
 

EC 2.7.11